Barry Ernest Conyngham, (born 27 August 1944) is an Australian composer and academic.  He has over seventy published works and over thirty recordings featuring his compositions, and his works have been premiered or performed in Australia, Japan, North and South America, the United Kingdom and Europe. His output is largely for orchestra, ensemble or dramatic forces.  He is an Emeritus Professor of both the University of Wollongong and Southern Cross University. He is former Dean of the Faculty of the Fine Arts and Music at the University of Melbourne.

Biography
Conyngham was born in Sydney.  He was initially interested in jazz, and studied with Raymond Hanson and Richard Meale  but turned his attention to orchestral writing in the mid-1960s with encouragement from Peter Sculthorpe.  He completed a Bachelor of Arts at the University of Sydney in 1967, and a Master of Arts (Hons.) at the same university in 1971.  In  1970 he visited Japan on a Churchill Fellowship, where he studied with Toru Takemitsu.  This was unusual, as Australian composers typically chose Europe and Britain as their location for further study.

In 1972 he went to the United States on a Harkness Fellowship  and gained a Certificate of Post-Doctoral Studies from the University of California, San Diego in 1973.  He was a Fellow of Princeton University 1973–74, and Composer-in-Residence at the University of Aix-Marseille in 1974–75.  He was a lecturer at the University of Melbourne from 1975 to 1979, then Senior Lecturer 1975–79.  He was a visiting scholar at the University of Minnesota, was a Senior Fulbright Fellow in 1982, and that year gained a Doctorate in Music from the University of Melbourne.  He became professor and head of the School of Creative Arts at the University of Wollongong 1989–94. He was the Foundation Vice-Chancellor of Southern Cross University 1994–2000, based in Lismore, New South Wales.

He was the first musician to hold the chair of Australian studies at Harvard University (2000–2001).

In 1978, he won the Albert H. Maggs Composition Award (he won it again in 2008). In 1997, he was appointed a Member of the Order of Australia (AM), "for service to music as a composer and to music education and administration".

In 2000, Barry Conyngham was invited to give the second annual Peggy Glanville-Hicks address for the Sydney Spring Festival.

In 2003, he was given a commission by the Ian Potter Music Commission Fellowship.

Conyngham has been involved with a number of arts organisations, including the World Music Council, Opera Australia, the Australian Music Centre and the Swiss Global Artistic Foundation.  He has also been chairman of the Music Board of the Australia Council.

After retiring from academic life to concentrate on composition and music performance, on 22 December 2010 he was appointed Dean of the Faculty of the VCA and Music at the University of Melbourne.

Works
 Bennelong (about the Australian Aborigine Bennelong; included puppets by Mirka Mora)
PUBLISHED SCORES

(Universal Edition London, Vienna.  Boosey & Hawkes London, Sydney. 
Hal Leonard/CoEdition Melbourne.)
	
 CRISIS: THOUGHTS IN A CITY (1968) for orchestra			UE 29004
 THE LITTLE SHERIFF (1969) for solo piano				UE 29132
 FIVE WINDOWS (1969) for orchestra					UE 29007
 THREE (1969) for string quartet and percussion				UE 29010
 FIVE (1970) for wind quintet							UE 29088
 WATER...FOOTSTEPS...TIME... (1970) for orchestra			UE 29060
 ICE CARVING (1970) for orchestra						UE 29085
 PLAYBACK (1972) for solo contrabass and 4-channel tape			UE 29081
 WITHOUT GESTURE (1973) for orchestra					UE 29080
 FROM VOSS (1973) for soprano and percussion				UE 29090(10)
 EDWARD JOHN EYRE (1971–73) chamber opera				UE 29067
 SNOWFLAKE (1973) solo for keyboards					UE 29082
 SIX (1971) for percussion and orchestra					UE 29128
 MIRROR IMAGES (1975) for ensemble					UE 29127
 NED (1974–77) opera								UE 29133
 SKY (1977) for string orchestra						UE 29212
 THE APOLOGY OF BONY ANDERSON (1978) opera			UE 29218
 MIRAGES (1978) for orchestra						UE 29223
 BONY ANDERSON (1978)	chamber opera					UE 29225
 SHADOWS OF NOH Concerto for Double Bass (1979)			UE 29244(20)
 BASHO (1980) for soprano and ensemble					UE 29239
 JOURNEYS (1980) solo wind (clarinets and saxophones)			UE 29242
 VIOLA (1981) for solo viola							UE 29222
 IMAGINARY LETTERS (1981) for chamber choir				UE 29230
 HORIZONS, Concerto for Orchestra (1980)					UE 29270
 SOUTHERN CROSS, Concerto for Violin and Piano (1981) 		UE 29252
 DWELLINGS (1982) for ensemble						UE 29255
 VOICINGS (1983) for ensemble and tape					UE 29265
 CELLO CONCERTO (1984) for cello and string orchestra			UE 29262
 FLY (1982–84) opera								UE 29338(30)
 PREVIEW (1984) for solo cello						UE 29292
 ANTIPODES (1984–85) for orchestra, chorus and soloists			UE 29300
 GENERATIONS (1985) for orchestra					UE 29300
 THE OATH OF BAD BROWN BILL (1985) children's opera		UE 29303
 RECURRENCES (1986) for large orchestra					UE29323 	
 VAST I 'The Sea' (1987) for orchestra					UE 29326
 VAST II 'The Coast' (1987) for orchestra					UE 29329
 VAST III 'The Centre' (1987) for orchestra					UE 29332
 VAST IV 'The Cities' (1987) for orchestra					UE 29335
 GLIMPSES (1987) for chamber orchestra					UE 29348(40)
 BENNELONG (1988) puppet opera						UE 29345
 MATILDA (1988) chorus and orchestra					UE 29340
 STREAMS (1988) for flute, harp and viola					UE 29350
 MONUMENTS, Concerto for Piano (1989)					UE 29400
 WATERWAYS, Concerto for Viola (1990)					UE 29401
 CLOUDLINES, Concerto for Harp (1991)					UE 29500
 AWAKENINGS (1991) for solo harp					UE 29501
 SHININGS (1992) for ensemble						UE 29550
 DECADES (1992) for orchestra						UE 29552
 BUNDANON (1994) for piano and orchestra			Boosey&Hawkes(50)
 AFTERIMAGES (1993) for koto and percussion				UE 29560
 AFTERIMAGES 2 (1994) for koto and orchestra			Boosey&Hawkes
 DAWNING (1996) for orchestra					Boosey&Hawkes
 NOSTALGIA (1997) for string orchestra				Boosey&Hawkes
 PASSING (1998) for orchestra					Boosey&Hawkes
 YEARNINGS (1999) for ensemble					Boosey&Hawkes
 STRING QUARTET (1999)						Boosey&Hawkes
 SEASONS (2000) for percussion and orchestra			Boosey&Hawkes
 FLUTE (2001) for solo flute						Boosey&Hawkes
 ANTIPODS (2001) for two pianos					Boosey&Hawkes(60)
 ORGAN (2001) for organ						Boosey&Hawkes 
 FIX (2001-2004) for solo baritone and orchestra			Boosey&Hawkes
 PLAYGROUND (2002) for violin, clarinet and piano		Boosey&Hawkes
 VEILS 1 (2003) for solo piano					Boosey&Hawkes
 VEILS 2 (2003) for solo piano					Boosey&Hawkes
 DREAMS GO WANDERING STILL (2003) orchestra 		Hal Leonard/CoEdition
 CATHEDRAL 1 (2005) for cello and piano				Hal Leonard/CoEdition
 NOW THAT DARKNESS (2005) for orchestra			Hal Leonard/CoEdition
 CATHEDRAL 2 (2006) for clarinet and piano			Hal Leonard/CoEdition
 TO THE EDGE (2006) for chamber orchestra			Hal Leonard/CoEdition (70)
 ELECTRIC LENIN (2005-6) chamber opera				Hal Leonard/CoEdition
 STRING QUARTET 3 (2007) (Bushfire Dreaming)			Hal Leonard/CoEdition
 CALA TUENT (2007-8) orchestra & folk instruments		Hal Leonard/CoEdition
 KANGAROO ISLAND, Concerto for Double Bass (2009) 		Hal Leonard/CoEdition
 SHOWBOAT KALANG (2010) for ensemble			Hal Leonard/CoEdition
 GARDENER OF TIME (2009–11) for orchestra			Hal Leonard/CoEdition
 FALLINGWATER (2011) two bassoons and orchestra 		Hal Leonard/CoEdition
 SILHOUETTES (2011) Flute and Guitar				Hal Leonard/CoEdition
 SYMPHONY (2012) for orchestra 					Hal Leonard/CoEdition
 TIME TIDES TENDERNESS (2013) piano trio and strings		Hal Leonard/CoEdition(80)
 DRYSPELL...DELUGE (2014) Ensemble				Hal Leonard/CoEdition
 ANZAC (2014) for Nine Soloist and orchestra			Hal Leonard/CoEdition
 GATHERING (2015) for 8-24 cellos					Hal Leonard/CoEdition
 DIASPORAS (2016) for orchestra					Hal Leonard/CoEdition
 PETRACHOR (2017) for Chamber Orchestra			Composer
 BUSHFIRE DREAMING (2018) for String Orchestra		Composer
 ONE SMALL STEP (2019) for orchestra				Hal Leonard/Composer
 MALLORCA SERENADE (2019) Guitar & Chamber Orchestra	Composer
 HAIKU (2021) for piano						    Composer
 SYMPHONY 2(2021)  for orchestra					Composer

Awards and nominations

ARIA Music Awards
The ARIA Music Awards is an annual awards ceremony that recognises excellence, innovation, and achievement across all genres of Australian music. They commenced in 1987. 

! 
|-
| 1987
| Southern Cross Ice Carving
| Best Classical Album
| 
| 
|-

Sources
 Harvard University Gazette

References

Further reading

External links
 Barry Conyngham : Represented Artist (Australian Music Centre)

1944 births
ARIA Award winners
Living people
Australian male classical composers
Australian classical composers
Australian music educators
Musicians from Sydney
Academic staff of Southern Cross University
Academic staff of the University of Wollongong
University of Sydney alumni
University of California, San Diego alumni
20th-century classical composers
20th-century Australian musicians
21st-century classical composers
21st-century Australian musicians
Harkness Fellows
Princeton University fellows
Academic staff of the University of Melbourne
University of Melbourne alumni
Members of the Order of Australia
Winners of the Albert H. Maggs Composition Award
20th-century Australian male musicians
21st-century Australian male musicians